The Fourth and Madison Building (formerly the IDX Tower) is a 40-story skyscraper in downtown Seattle, Washington. The building is located at 925 Fourth Avenue, at the intersection with Madison Street. Upon its completion in 2002, the late-modernist highrise was Seattle's first building to exceed  in over a decade.

In 2007, Fourth and Madison was awarded the BOMA International Office Building of the Year Award in the  category.

The rooftop garden on the seventh floor is a privately owned public open space (POPOS).

Construction of the foundation required shoring around the Great Northern Tunnel and Downtown Seattle Transit Tunnel. The tower also cantilevers  over the Downtown YMCA.

References

External links

IDX Tower Special Feature by Seattle Daily Journal of Commerce

Office buildings completed in 2002
Skyscraper office buildings in Seattle
2002 establishments in Washington (state)
Leadership in Energy and Environmental Design gold certified buildings